William Holman Bentley (1855-1905) was an English missionary, Baptist Missionary Society missionary in the Congo.

Works
 Dictionary and grammar of the Kongo language as spoken at San Salvador, the ancient capital of the old Kongo Empire, Central Africa, London: Baptist Missionary Society, 1886
 Life on the Congo, 	London: Religious Tract Society, 1887
 Ekangu Diampa dia Mfumu eto Jizu Kristu wa Mvuluzi eto. Disekwelo muna kingrekia yamu kisi kongo, London: British and Foreign Bible Society, 1893
 Pioneering on the Congo, London: The Religious Tract Society, 1900.

References

1855 births
1905 deaths
English Baptist missionaries
Christian missionaries in the Democratic Republic of the Congo
British expatriates in the Democratic Republic of the Congo
19th-century Baptists